Jalalabad , is a village in the Multan District of Punjab, Pakistan. It is located at 30°8'10N 71°21'0E with an altitude of 115 metres (380 feet). In 2003, the village was hit by flooding, destroying houses and crops.

References

Populated places in Multan District